Hardys may refer to:

The Hardys, professional wrestling tag team
Hardee's, American fast-food restaurant chain

See also
Hardy (disambiguation)